Cliniodes opalalis is a moth in the family Crambidae. It was described by Achille Guenée in 1854. It is found in Central America, north to southern Mexico. It is also found in Cuba, Jamaica and in the Andes from Colombia to Bolivia. It has also been recorded from northern Venezuela, Trinidad and Tobago and north-eastern Brazil.

The length of the forewings is 11–19 mm for males and 13–20 mm for females. The forewing costa is brown and violet and the basal area is brownish grey. The medial area is chocolate brown, violet brown or dark magenta and the postmedial area is brown or reddish brown. The hindwings are translucent white with a black marginal band. Adults have been recorded on wing year round.

References

Moths described in 1854
Eurrhypini